The  was a headquarters organization and general army of the Imperial Japanese Army, established to control all land and air units stationed within Japan proper, Korea and Taiwan during World War II.

History
The General Defense Command was established on July 5, 1941 under the direct command of the Emperor via the Imperial General Headquarters. For administrative, recruiting and accounting purposes, Japan was divided into six army districts, each with a garrison force equivalent to an army corps:

Eastern District Army – HQ in Tokyo and responsible for the Kantō region and northern Honshū
Western District Army – HQ in Fukuoka and responsible for southwestern Honshū, Shikoku and the Ryukyu Islands.
Northern District Army – HQ in Sapporo and responsible for Hokkaidō and Karafuto.
Central District Army – HQ in Osaka and responsible for central Honshū.
Chosen Army – HQ in Keijo and responsible for Korea
Taiwan Army – HQ in Taihoku and responsible for Taiwan.

The General Defense Command was also responsible for anti-aircraft defenses, and for organizing civil defense training.

List of Commanders

Commanding officer

Chief of Staff

See also
Armies of the Imperial Japanese Army

References

Books

External links

Army groups of Japan
Military units and formations established in 1941
Military units and formations disestablished in 1945